A winter festival, winter carnival, snow festival,  or frost fair is an outdoor cold weather celebration that occurs in wintertime.

Winter festivals are popular in D climates (see Köppen climate classification) where winter is particularly long or severe, such as Siberia, Scandinavia, Canada and the northern United States. Most winter carnivals involve traditional winter pursuits such as dog sledding, ice hockey, ice carving, skating, skiing, and snow carving.

Some notable winter carnivals include:

World
 Winter Olympic Games

Canada
 Bon Soo Winter Carnival - held in Sault Sainte Marie, Ontario
 Ice on Whyte Festival - held in Edmonton, Alberta
 Parc Jean Drapeau Winter Festival - held in Montreal, Quebec
 Quebec Winter Carnival - held in Quebec City, Quebec
 Snowking Winter Festival - held in Yellowknife, Northwest Territories
 Winter Festival of Lights - held in Niagara Falls, Ontario
 Winterlude - held in the National Capital Region along the Ontario-Quebec border

China
 Changbai Mountain International Winter Carnival - held in Erdaobaihe
 Harbin International Ice and Snow Sculpture Festival - held in Harbin, Heilongjiang

England
 River Thames frost fairs - formerly held in London, England between the 17th century and early 19th century

Estonia
 Tallinn Christmas Market - held in Tallinn

France
 Concours International de Sculpture sur Glace et sur Neige - held in Valloire

Japan
 Asahikawa Winter Festival - held in Asahikawa, Hokkaidō
 Chitose Lake Shikotsu Ice Festival - held in Chitose, Hokkaidō
 Iwate Snow Festival - held in Iwate-gun, Iwate Prefecture
 Lake Shikaribetsu Kotan - held on top of frozen Lake Shikaribetsu in Shikaoi, Hokkaidō
 Sapporo Snow Festival - held in Sapporo, Hokkaido
 Tokamachi Snow Festival - held in Tōkamachi, Niigata Prefecture

Latvia
 International Ice Sculpture Festival - held in Jelgava

Norway
 Holmenkollen Ski Festival - held in Holmenkollen, Oslo
 Ice Music Festival - held in Geilo

Russia
 International Festival-Competition of Snow and Ice Sculpture - held in Krasnoyarsk
 Perm International Snow and Ice Sculpture Festival - held in Perm

Sweden
 Gamla stan Christmas market - held in Gamla stan in Stockholm, Sweden
 Jul på Liseberg - held at Liseberg in Göteborg, Sweden
 Skansen Christmas market - held at Skansen in Stockholm, Sweden
 Swedish Ski Games - held in Falun, Sweden

United States
 Annual frost faire at Saratoga National Historical Park - held in Saratoga County, New York
 Bavarian IceFest - held in Leavenworth, Washington
 Budweiser International Snow Sculpture Championships - held in Breckenridge, Colorado
 Dartmouth Winter Carnival - held in Hanover, New Hampshire
 Michigan Technological University's Winter Carnival - held in Houghton, Michigan
 Saint Paul Winter Carnival - held in Saint Paul, Minnesota
 City of Lakes Loppet - held in Minneapolis, Minnesota
 Saranac Lake Winter Carnival - held in Saranac Lake, New York
 Steamboat Springs Winter Carnival - held in Steamboat Springs, Colorado
 Wintersköl™ - held in Aspen, Colorado
 World Ice Art Championships - held in Fairbanks, Alaska

See also
Christmas market
List of Christmas markets
List of ice and snow sculpture events

References

 Beam, Amy L. (1991) Beam's Directory of International Tourist Events Washington, DC: TTA Press  pg 387-388
 (1984) The Official International Directory of Special Events & Festivals  pg 371

 
Winter events